Dechi Marcel N'Guessan (born 12 November 1991) is an Ivorian footballer who plays as a midfielder for Malaysia Super League club Kedah Darul Aman.

Club career

Kedah
On 16 December 2021, Dechi Marcel agreed to join Malaysia Super League side Kedah Darul Aman.

Career statistics

Club

References

External links
 

1991 births
Living people
Ivorian footballers
Association football midfielders
Malaysia Premier League players
Malaysia Super League players
ES Bingerville players
UiTM FC players
Terengganu FC players
Terengganu F.C. II players
Expatriate footballers in Malaysia